Krylo Airlines was an airline based in Moscow, Russia, which operated regional passenger services and freight charters between 1990 and 2003.

Code data
IATA Code: K9
ICAO Code: KRI
Callsign: Krylo

History
The airline was established in December 1990 and started operations in January 1991. It started international charter services as a means of earning revenue following a fall in state funding.

Fleet
Upon closure, the Krylo Airlines fleet included one Antonov An-26

References

Defunct airlines of Russia
Airlines established in 1990
Airlines disestablished in 2003
Companies based in Moscow
1990 establishments in Russia
2003 disestablishments in Russia